Nizhny Tykhtem (Tübänge Tiktäm) is a rural locality (a village) in Kelteyevsky Selsoviet, Kaltasinsky District, Bashkortostan, Russia. The population was 159 as of 2010. There are 5 streets.

Geography 
Nizhny Tykhtem is located 13 km west of Kaltasy (the district's administrative centre) by road. Verkhny Tykhtem is the nearest rural locality.

References 

Rural localities in Kaltasinsky District
Ufa Governorate